Sub-bass flute may refer to: 

 Contrabass flute
 Subcontrabass flute